Legislative elections were held in Macau on 30 September 1992.

Results

Members
Geographical constituency (8 seats)
Union for Promoting Progress: Leong Heng Teng and Kou Hou In
Union for Development: Tong Chi Kin and Fernando Chui
New Democratic Macau Association: Antonio Ng
Unity for the Future of Macau: Susana Chou
Labor Solidarity: Alberto Madeira Noronha
Friendship Association: Alexandre Ho

Functional constituencies (8 seats)
Business: Ma Man Kei, Edmund Ho, Pedro Segundo Pan Sau Macias (Peter Pan) and Victor Ng
Labor: Lau Cheok Va and Pang Vai Kam
Professionals: Leonel Alberto Alves
Welfare, Cultural, Educational and Sports: Anabela Fátima Xavier Sales Ritchie

Nominated members (7 seats)
José João de Deus Rodrigues do Rosário
Raimundo Arrais do Rosário
Beatriz Amélia Alves de Sousa Oliveira Basto da Silva
Joaquim Jorge Perestrelo Neto Valente
António Correia
António José Félix Pontes
Rui António Craveiro Afonso

References

Elections in Macau
Macau
Legislative
Macau